The 2013 FIM MotoGP World Championship was the premier class of the 65th F.I.M. Road Racing World Championship season.

Season summary

Jorge Lorenzo started the season as the defending World Champion, while Honda was the defending Manufacturers' Champion. Moto2 champion Marc Márquez joined the MotoGP grid with Repsol Honda.

In the premier MotoGP class, Lorenzo, along with Repsol Honda teammates Marc Márquez and Dani Pedrosa battled it out for most of the season in regards to the championship battle. Lorenzo won the opening race of the season in Qatar, before rookie Márquez became the youngest premier class winner, as he claimed victory in the inaugural Grand Prix of the Americas in Texas. Pedrosa took back-to-back victories at Jerez – where Márquez and Lorenzo battled for second place, clashing at the final corner – and Le Mans, before Lorenzo did likewise at Mugello, and Catalunya; at the former, Márquez retired from the race after crashing out of second place. At Assen, Lorenzo crashed during free practice and fractured his collarbone, and after emergency surgery and initial reports that he would not take part for the rest of the weekend, he competed in the race and finished fifth. Márquez and Pedrosa finished second and fourth respectively, as Valentino Rossi took his first race victory since . Márquez then won the next four races, starting at the Sachsenring, where both Lorenzo and Pedrosa were sidelined with injuries; Lorenzo with a recurrence of his Assen injury after crashing in free practice once again, while Pedrosa was ruled out with low blood pressure, stemming from a separate incident.

After two more victories for Lorenzo at Silverstone, and Misano, Márquez and Pedrosa collided at the Aragon Grand Prix, where a slight touch caused a sensor on Pedrosa's bike to tear and cut the traction control system. Márquez went on to beat Lorenzo to victory, and after Pedrosa won in Malaysia, Márquez held a 43-point lead in the championship with three races to go. However, a disqualification in Australia, as well as Lorenzo winning both in Australia and Japan reduced that margin to thirteen, ahead of the final race in Valencia; the first final race title decider since . Pedrosa's second place, behind Lorenzo, was enough for Honda to clinch the constructors' championship.

Regulation changes 
The MotoGP class saw the introduction of a new qualifying system, in which the riders placed eleventh or lower based on times in Free Practice 3 were sent to Qualifying 1. The two fastest riders from that session would then join the ten fastest riders in Qualifying 2 to set the first 12 positions of the starting grid.

Calendar
The Fédération Internationale de Motocyclisme released a 19-race provisional calendar on 19 September 2012. On 23 November 2012, the calendar was updated following confirmation that the return of the Argentine Grand Prix would be postponed to 2014. The Grand Prix of the Americas held at the Circuit of the Americas in Austin, United States, replaced the Portuguese Grand Prix, which had been run at Estoril since 2000. The United States hosted three races, the other two being the United States Grand Prix at Mazda Raceway Laguna Seca and the Indianapolis Grand Prix at the Indianapolis Motor Speedway.

The following Grands Prix took place in 2013:

 ‡ = Night race
 † = MotoGP class only
 †† = Saturday race

Calendar changes
 The Grand Prix of the Americas was added to the calendar.
 The Portuguese Grand Prix was taken off the calendar. The race was scheduled on the calendar since 2000.
 The British Grand Prix was moved back, from 17 June to 1 September.
 Only the MotoGP class raced during the United States Grand Prix because of a Californian law on air pollution and the contract that had initially been signed prevented the Moto3 and Moto2 classes from racing from when they were still 125cc and 250cc 2-stroke bikes.
 The Japanese Grand Prix was moved back, from 14 to 27 October.

Teams and riders
 A provisional entry list was released by the Fédération Internationale de Motocyclisme on 28 November 2012. An updated entry list was released on 12 February 2013.

All the bikes used Bridgestone tyres.

Rider changes 
 Hiroshi Aoyama returned to MotoGP full-time after competing in just one event in 2012. He rode an FTR Moto prepared by Avintia Racing.
 Héctor Barberá left Pramac Racing at the end of the 2012 season. When his departure was confirmed in September 2012, he had not secured a ride with any other team, but confirmed his intentions to race for team competing under Claiming Rule Teams regulations.
 Claudio Corti stepped up to the MotoGP category, racing alongside Colin Edwards at Forward Racing.
 Andrea Dovizioso replaced Valentino Rossi at Ducati after spending one season as a Monster Yamaha Tech 3 semi-works rider.
 James Ellison lost his place with Paul Bird Motorsport.
 Yonny Hernández moved from Avintia Racing to Paul Bird Motorsport.
 Andrea Iannone moved up from Moto2 to MotoGP in 2013, joining Pramac Racing.
 Michael Laverty, who competed in the British Superbike Championship from 2010 until 2012 entered MotoGP with Paul Bird Motorsport.
 Marc Márquez joined the MotoGP category, racing for the Repsol Honda Team after rules preventing rookie riders from racing for factory teams were relaxed.
 Mattia Pasini returned to Moto2 in 2013, riding with Forward Racing.
 Michele Pirro lost his place at Gresini Racing.
 After two seasons racing for Ducati, Valentino Rossi returned to Yamaha.
 Iván Silva lost his place at Avintia Racing.
 Bradley Smith, who rode for Tech 3 in the Moto2 category in the 2010 and 2011 seasons was promoted to the team's MotoGP squad, Monster Yamaha Tech 3.
 In July 2012, Ben Spies announced that he would leave the Yamaha Factory Racing team at the end of the 2012 season. He was later confirmed as switching to Ducati, joining Pramac Racing.
 Bryan Staring, who made occasional appearances in MotoGP, the Superbike World Championship and Supersport World Championships, entered the category full-time riding a CRT bike prepared by Gresini Racing.
 2007 and 2011 MotoGP World Champion Casey Stoner officially announced his retirement at the French Grand Prix effective from the end of the 2012 season, returning to his native Australia to compete in the Dunlop V8 Supercar Series.
 Lukáš Pešek moved to MotoGP, with IodaRacing Project.

Team changes 
 Cardion AB Motoracing ended its association with Ducati and switched to a CRT-spec ART-Aprilia.
 CRT teams Forward Racing, IodaRacing Project and Paul Bird Motorsport expanded their operations to include a second bike.

Results and standings

Grands Prix

Riders' standings
Scoring system
Points were awarded to the top fifteen finishers. A rider had to finish the race to earn points.

Constructors' standings
Scoring system
Points were awarded to the top fifteen finishers. A rider had to finish the race to earn points.

 Each constructor got the same number of points as their best placed rider in each race.

Notes
 1 All points from the race victory for Marc Márquez were deducted as a result of a decision from Race Direction, after Márquez collided with teammate Dani Pedrosa during the race. Honda's next-best finisher was Álvaro Bautista, who scored a fourth-place finish.

Teams' standings
The teams' standings were based on results obtained by regular and substitute riders; wild-card entries were ineligible.

References

External links
 The official website of Grand Prix motorcycle racing

 
Grand Prix motorcycle racing seasons
Grand Prix motorcycle racing